Fred Wilkinson (born 1889) was an English footballer who played in the Football League for Blackpool, Watford and Stoke.

Career
Wilkinson was born in Bury, Lancashire, and played football for Lancaster, Norwich City and Darlington before joining Football League side Blackpool in 1912.

Wilkinson  made his debut for Blackpool in the opening league game of the 1912–13 campaign, a 1–1 draw at Grimsby Town on 3 September. He went on to make a further fourteen appearances, scoring once (in a 2–1 victory over Bury at Bloomfield Road on 14 September). His final start for the "Tangerines" occurred on 5 April, in a 5–1 defeat at Leicester Fosse on 29 March. He was replaced in the line-up by Wilf Gillow.

After leaving Blackpool he went on to play for Newport County and Stalybridge Celtic before re-entering league football with Watford where he spent the 1920–21 season. At the start of the 1921–22 season he joined Stoke and played in the first three matches before leaving Stoke. He went on to play for Suffolk side Bury St Edmunds.

Career statistics

References

English footballers
Lancaster City F.C. players
Blackpool F.C. players
Darlington F.C. players
Norwich City F.C. players
Stoke City F.C. players
Watford F.C. players
English Football League players
1889 births
Footballers from Bury, Greater Manchester
Year of death missing
Newport County A.F.C. players
Stalybridge Celtic F.C. players
Bury Town F.C. players
Association football midfielders